This article displays the qualifying draw of the 2011 Grand Prix SAR La Princesse Lalla Meryem.

Players

Seeds

Qualifiers

Lucky losers
  Eleni Daniilidou

Qualifying draw

First qualifier

Second qualifier

Third qualifier

Fourth qualifier

References
 Qualifying Draw

2011 - qualifying
Grand Prix SAR La Princesse Lalla Meryem - qualifying
2011 in Moroccan tennis